"Navillera" (: "You and I") is a song recorded by South Korean girl group GFriend for their first studio album, LOL (2016). The song was released by Source Music on July 11, 2016, as the album's title track. The song became the group's second number-one single in South Korea, topping the Gaon Digital Chart for two consecutive weeks. The song also holds the record for the only song to stay at number-one on Gaon Download Chart for three consecutive weeks.

Composition
The song was written and produced by longtime collaborators Iggy and Youngbae, who are behind the group's first three singles.

Release and promotion
LOL is GFriend's first studio album, released eighteen months after their debut. It follows their three successful extended plays that comprise their "school series" trilogy. It was released at midnight on July 11, 2016, in two versions: "Laughing Out Loud" and "Lots of Love". That same day, GFriend held two showcases in Seoul, where they performed songs from the album. The media showcase was held at Yes24 Live Hall in Gwangjin-gu, and the showcase for fans was broadcast live via Naver's V app. The group then promoted the album on music shows, starting with SBS MTV's The Show on July 12, where they performed "Navillera" and "Gone with the Wind". In the second week of promotion, GFriend won all five music show awards, on The Show, Show Champion, M! Countdown, Music Bank, and Inkigayo. They won a total of 14 music show awards, including triple crowns (three consecutive wins) on The Show, M! Countdown, and Inkigayo.

They promoted the album with the showcase tour The L.O.L Asia showcase, started on July 10, 2016 in Yes24 Live Hall, Seoul, South Korea, ended in Taipei International Convention Center, Taipei, Taiwan on October 1, 2016.

Music video and promotion
A music video for the song premiered on the music-oriented pay-TV channel MBC Music on July 8, 2016 (rated as "suitable for all ages"); and was released two days later on the respective YouTube channels of GFriend and 1theK. The video features the group in a retro scenario intercalated with dance scenes.

GFriend began promoting "Navillera" on South Korea's music shows on July 12, 2016, starting with a live performance on SBS MTV's The Show. The group won their first music show trophy for the song on July 19. They went on to receive 14 total music show wins for "Navillera" including triple crowns (three consecutive wins) on The Show, M! Countdown, and Inkigayo, scoring the second-most music show wins for a girl group song in 2016 after their own song "Rough" which accumulated 15 music show wins.

Chart performance
The song debuted atop the Gaon Digital Chart, on the chart issue dated July 10–16, 2016, with 278,636 downloads sold - topping the Download Chart - and 4,917,825 streams. In its second week, the song stayed atop the chart and fell to number 2 in its third week.

The song also debuted at number 4 on the chart for the month of July 2016, with 482,833 downloads sold and 14,741,974 streams. The song also made the year-end chart as the 29th best-performing song of 2016, with 1,113,582 downloads sold and 56,753,386 streams.

Accolades

Charts

Weekly charts

Year-end charts

Notes

References

2016 songs
2016 singles
GFriend songs
Korean-language songs
Kakao M singles
Hybe Corporation singles